is a Japanese politician of the Japanese Communist Party, a member of the House of Councillors in the Diet (national legislature). A native of Kyoto, Kyoto and dropout of Kobe University, he was elected to the House of Councillors for the first time in 2001 after an unsuccessful run in 1998.

References

External links 
  in Japanese.

Members of the House of Councillors (Japan)
Japanese Communist Party politicians
Living people
1956 births
People from Kyoto